ROKS Gyeongnam (FFG-819) is the second ship of the Daegu-class frigate in the Republic of Korea Navy. She is named after the place, Gyeongnam.

Development 

Modifications to the Incheon-class include a TB-250K towed array sonar system and a 16-cell Korean Vertical Launching System (K-VLS) that is able to deploy the K-SAAM, Hong Sang Eo anti-submarine missile, and Haeryong tactical land attack cruise missiles.

The hull design is generally based on the one of the Incheon-class. However, as a part of weapon system modifications, the superstructure has been significantly changed. The hangar and a hellicopter deck on stern has been enlarged to support the operation of a 10-ton helicopter.

Construction and career 
ROKS Gyeongnam was launched on 21 June 2019 by Daewoo Shipbuilding and commissioned on 4 January 2021.

References

2019 ships
Daegu-class frigates
Ships built by Daewoo Shipbuilding & Marine Engineering